Ardozyga euryarga is a species of moth in the family Gelechiidae. It was described by Turner in 1919. It is found in Australia, where it has been recorded from southern Queensland.

The forewings are fuscous-brown with a broad white costal streak from the base to the apex, narrowing at the extremities, containing some brownish scales towards the costa posteriorly, narrowly edged with fuscous beneath, and slightly indented at one-third and two-thirds, the indentations representing the discal stigmata. There is some white suffusion along the dorsum and tornus. The hindwings are whitish, towards the apex grey-whitish, in females pale-grey.

References

Ardozyga
Moths described in 1919
Moths of Australia